The 1676 siege of Maastricht was a failed attempt by William III of Orange to take the city, which had been occupied by the French since 1673. The siege took place during the Franco-Dutch war of 6 July to 27 August 1676.

Background

In the 1667-1668 War of Devolution, France captured most of the Spanish Netherlands but the Triple Alliance of the Dutch Republic, England and Sweden forced them to relinquish most of these gains in the Treaty of Aix-la-Chapelle. Louis XIV now moved to break up the Alliance; Sweden remained neutral in return for the payment of large subsidies, while England agreed to join the French against the Dutch in the 1670 Treaty of Dover. 

Alliances with Münster and the Electorate of Cologne allowed the French to bypass defences in the Spanish Netherlands when they invaded the Dutch Republic in May 1672. They seemed to have achieved an overwhelming victory but the Dutch army then withdrew behind the Dutch Water Line and the gates were opened on 22 June, flooding the land and preventing further advances. On 4 July, William of Orange was appointed Stadtholder and repelled an invasion force from Münster, recapturing most of the territory lost in June.

By late July, the Dutch position had stabilised, while concern at French gains brought them support from Frederick William of Brandenburg-Prussia, Emperor Leopold and Charles II of Spain. In August, Johan and Cornelis de Witt, whose policies were blamed for the Dutch collapse, were lynched by an Orangist mob, leaving William in control. Louis was now forced into another war of attrition around the French frontiers, with an Imperial army opening a new front in the Rhineland. 

Until the advent of railways in the 19th century, goods and supplies were largely transported by water, making rivers like the Lys, Sambre and Meuse vital for trade and military operations. In June 1673, the French took Maastricht, which controlled a key access point on the Meuse but the Dutch recaptured Naarden in September 1673, while Münster and Cologne left the war in November. This was followed in early 1674 by Denmark joining the Alliance and England agreeing peace with the Dutch in the Treaty of Westminster. The French were now over-extended and withdrew from the Dutch Republic, retaining only Maastricht.

The siege
In the summer of 1676 William III decided to put an end to the French presence in Maastricht. He was supported by Carlos de Gurrea, Duke of Villahermosa and Governor of the Habsburg Netherlands. On July 3, he martialed his forces found a great place near Nivelles, and began to march on Maastricht. The combined armies reached Maastricht on July 6. Under William's command were General Georg Friedrich of Waldeck, while the Spanish forces were under de Gurrea. Also present were regiments from England (under the command of John Fenwick), as well as forces from Brandenburg and the Palatinate-Neuburg.

Due to delays, the first assault on the fortified town wasn't until July 21, and was focused on the Zyl Fronts, in the northwestern section near the Bosch part.  This was considered the weakest portion of the city's defenses. During the attacks in late July and August, the Dutch forces suffered a thousand casualties. During one of the attacks in early August, Karel Florentine of Salm, the lieutenant general of the infantry, and right hand of William III, suffered fatal injuries.

While the siege continued, peace talks were taking place at Nijmegen. While these failed to lead to an end to the siege, they would eventually lead to the first Treaties of Nijmegen.

William was given a letter by Meinhard Schomberg on August 17, which had been sent to the commander of the fortress, and had been intercepted. The letter was informing the commander that a French relief column was on their way to break up the siege. William met with Waldeck at Tongeren, also present were the Bishop of Osnabrück, the Marquis of Louvigny, as well as military officers from Spain and Austria. The siege continued, with the allied Dutch forces continuing to attempt to outflank the garrison through the suburb of Wyck on August 23.  However, with the impending arrival of the French relief column, the siege was abandoned on August 27.

Reasons for the failure of the siege varied. Some blamed weak command skills of the Dutch, while others thought it was due to a lack of support from William's allies. Another theory was that the low water level of the river Meuse, made the supply of water for the Dutch forces inadequate.

Bibliography
 ;
 ;

References

Conflicts in 1676
1676 in the Dutch Republic
Sieges involving the Dutch Republic
Sieges involving France
Sieges involving Spain
Battles in Limburg (Netherlands)
Siege
Events in Maastricht
Franco-Dutch War
William III of England